Madonna of the Roses is a c.1530 oil on panel painting by Titian, now in the Uffizi in Florence. As well as the Madonna and Child it also shows Anthony the Great. and a young John the Baptist. It is signed "Ticianus f.", but this may be a later addition.

It formed part of the collection of Archduke Leopold Wilhelm of Austria. In 1793 it and several other works were exchanged between Vienna and Florence, also including Titian's Flora, Dürer's Adoration of the Magi and Giovanni Bellini's Holy Allegory.

Bibliography
Francesco Valcanover, L'opera completa di Tiziano, Rizzoli, Milano 1969.

References

Paintings of the Madonna and Child by Titian
1530 paintings
Paintings in the collection of the Uffizi